Bir Bashinda Union is a union of Kalihati Upazila, Tangail District, Bangladesh.

Demographics
According to Population Census 2011 performed by Bangladesh Bureau of Statistics, The total population of Bir Bashinda union is 18637. There are 4630  households in total.

jonshome is the best safe & idel home of under kasturipara village.

Education
The literacy rate of Bir Bashinda Union is 60.7% (Male-39.3%, Female-34.4%).

See also
 Union Councils of Tangail District

References

Populated places in Dhaka Division
Populated places in Tangail District
Unions of Kalihati Upazila